

Bolshevik Island is an island in Severnaya Zemlya, Krasnoyarsk Krai, Russian Arctic. The island is named after the political faction of the same name.

History
The island, together with the eastern coast of what was named Emperor Nicholas II Land, was discovered by Boris Vilkitsky at the time of the 1913 Arctic Ocean Hydrographic Expedition. Its insularity, however, wasn't proven until 1931, when Georgy Ushakov and Nikolay Urvantsev charted the archipelago during their 1930–32 expedition.

Prima Polar Station, currently the only Polar station operating in Severnaya Zemlya, is located in this island near Cape Baranov.

Geography
It is the southernmost island and the second largest island in the group. The island is mountainous reaching a height of 935 m. Most of these ice formations do not reach the sea, ending in moraines in valleys or coastal plains having a sparse vegetation of moss and lichen.

Parts of the shore of the island are deeply indented, with Mikoyan Bay in the northopening to the Shokalsky Strait, as well as fjords such as Akhmatov Fjord, Thaelmann Fjord, Spartak Fjord and Partizan Fjord. Cape Unslicht (Mys Peschanyy) is the northernmost point of Bolshevik Island and Cape Neupokoyev at the SW end the southernmost.
Ostrov Tash is a small island located on Bolshevik's southern shore. Lavrov Island and Blizky Island are located off the NE shore and Ostrov Lishniy off its northern tip.

The group formed by the larger Maly Taymyr and Starokadomsky islands is located further offshore off the southeastern end.

Image gallery

Weather conditions

See also 
 List of islands of Russia
 List of research stations in the Arctic

References

External links

Islands of the Kara Sea
Islands of the Laptev Sea
Islands of Severnaya Zemlya